Christian Fernando Alemán Alegría (born 5 February 1996) is an Ecuadorian professional footballer who plays as an attacking midfielder for Aucas.

Career
Emelec were Alemán's first club, he joined their youth system at the age of 5 and went on to play senior football for them from 2013 to 2014 and made eleven appearances in the Ecuadorian Serie A. His senior debut for Emelec arrived on 19 June 2013 against Manta, a team he would go on to join in July 2015. Prior to joining Manta, Alemán signed for Técnico Universitario of the Ecuadorian Serie B. He featured four times before leaving for Manta, also of Serie B. For Manta, he scored five goals, including two in an 8–0 win over Deportivo Azogues on 28 November, in fourteen games as they finished 6th.

January 2016 saw him join Deportivo Quito in Serie B, but he left eight months later to play for Ecuadorian Serie A team Barcelona SC. He made his Barcelona debut on 21 August 2016 in a 5–1 victory over Fuerza Amarilla. Twenty-one further appearances came during 2016 and 2017, before Alemán departed Ecuadorian football for the first time to move to Argentine Primera División side Estudiantes. He scored on his debut for Estudiantes, netting the winning goal against Arsenal de Sarandí on 28 August 2017. He left after six appearances in June 2018, subsequently scoring ten goals in three seasons back with Barcelona.

In September 2020, Alemán headed to fellow Ecuadorian Serie A club Guayaquil City. Nine appearances followed. On 20 December 2020, Alemán agreed a free transfer to Poland with I liga side Arka Gdynia; with his one-and-a-half-year contract commencing in January 2021. 

On 21 December 2022, it was announced he would return to Ecuador to join the 2022 season champions Aucas in 2023.

Personal life
Alemán is the half-brother of fellow footballer Javier Charcopa.

Career statistics

Honours
Emelec
Ecuadorian Serie A: 2013, 2014

Barcelona SC
Ecuadorian Serie A: 2016

References

External links
 

1996 births
Living people
Ecuadorian footballers
Sportspeople from Guayaquil
Association football midfielders
Ecuadorian expatriate footballers
Expatriate footballers in Argentina
Expatriate footballers in Poland
Ecuadorian expatriates in Argentina
Ecuadorian expatriates in Poland
Ecuadorian Serie A players
Ecuadorian Serie B players
Argentine Primera División players
I liga players
C.S. Emelec footballers
C.D. Técnico Universitario footballers
Manta F.C. footballers
S.D. Quito footballers
Barcelona S.C. footballers
Estudiantes de La Plata footballers
Guayaquil City F.C. footballers
Arka Gdynia players
S.D. Aucas footballers